Ricardo Blas (born 17 June 1954) is a sports administrator and a former judoka from Guam. He competed in the men's heavyweight event at the 1988 Summer Olympics.

He is the current Secretary General of Oceania National Olympic Committees and President of the Oceania Continent Handball Federation.

References

External links
 

1954 births
Living people
Guamanian male judoka
Olympic judoka of Guam
Judoka at the 1988 Summer Olympics
Place of birth missing (living people)